Darragh Greene (born 20 October 1995) is an Irish swimmer. He competed in the men's 100 metre breaststroke at the 2019 World Aquatics Championships. He qualified to represent Ireland at the 2020 Summer Olympics In Tokyo Japan.

References

External links
 

1995 births
Living people
Irish male swimmers
Place of birth missing (living people)
Male breaststroke swimmers
Swimmers at the 2020 Summer Olympics
Olympic swimmers of Ireland
20th-century Irish people
21st-century Irish people